Ludwigsburg (Swabian: Ludisburg) is a city in Baden-Württemberg, Germany, about  north of Stuttgart city centre, near the river Neckar. It is the largest and primary city of the Ludwigsburg district with about 88,000 inhabitants. It is situated within the Stuttgart Region, and the district is part of the administrative region (Regierungsbezirk) of Stuttgart.

History
The middle of Neckarland, where Ludwigsburg lies, was settled in the Stone and Bronze Ages. Numerous archaeological sites from the Hallstatt period remain in the city and surrounding area. 

Towards the end of the 1st century, the area was occupied by the Romans. They pushed the Limes further to the east around 150 and controlled the region until 260, when the Alamanni occupied the Neckarland. Evidence of the Alamanni settlement can be found in grave sites in the city today.

The origins of Ludwigsburg date from the beginning of the 18th century (1718–1723) when the largest baroque castle in Germany, Ludwigsburg Palace was built by Duke Eberhard Ludwig von Württemberg. Originally, the Duke planned to just build one country home (albeit a palace), which he began building in 1704.  However, the examples of other princes fostered a desire to project his absolutist power by establishing a city. To the baroque palace, he added a hunting lodge and country seat, called Schloss Favorite (1713–1728), and the Seeschloss (castle on the lake) Monrepos (1764–1768).

A settlement began near the palace in 1709 and  a town charter was granted on 3 April 1718. That same year, Ludwigsburg became a bailiff's seat, which eventually became the rural district of Ludwigsburg in 1938.

In the years between 1730 and 1800, the royal seat of residence changed back and forth several times between Stuttgart and Ludwigsburg. In 1800, Württemberg was occupied by France under Napoleon Bonaparte and was forced into an alliance. In 1806, the Kurfürst (Prince-Elector) Friedrich was made king of Württemberg by Napoleon. In 1812, the Württembergish army was raised in Ludwigsburg for Napoleon's Russian campaign. Of the 15,800 Württemberg soldiers who served, just a few hundred returned.

In 1921, Ludwigsburg became the largest garrison in southwest Germany. In 1945, Ludwigsburg was made a "Kreisstadt" (urban district), and later, when the Baden-Württemberg municipal code took effect on 1 April 1956, the city was named a major urban district. In 1956 the tradition of the German garrison town was taken up again by the Bundeswehr, Germany's federal armed forces.

2004 was the 300th birthday of Residenzschloss Ludwigsburg, celebrated by the opening of the Baroque Gallery and the Ceramic Museum in the Residenzschloss.

Founding
The area around Ludwigsburg had been a favored hunting grounds by the royal Württemberg family for generations before the founding of Ludwigsburg.  Although the region was wilderness, it was easily accessible by boat using the Neckar River.  In 1704 the founder of Ludwigsburg, Eberhard Louis, Duke of Württemberg, arranged for the laying of the foundation stone for Ludwigsburg Palace.  Ludwigsburg is named after the Duke Eberhard Louis' middle name, Ludwig being the German name for Louis.  Right up until his death, construction workers and craftsmen worked on what was to become one of the largest Baroque palace ensembles in Europe.  Under Eberhard Louis and his successor, Charles Eugene, the Palace served as the royal residence of Württemberg for a total of 28 years.  With the Palace as their Gesamtkunstwerk (translated literally, "collective work of art") and the opulent festivals they organized, the Dukes put their unbounded power on display with no consideration for the finances of Württemberg.  To them, their most important task was to bring fame and renown to the court of Württemberg and to compete with and outdo other European rulers in this regard.

Duke Eberhard Louis planned to found an ideal Baroque city right beside Ludwigsburg Palace.  From 1709 onwards, he tried to attract new residents to the city with a series of incentives: first he promised free plots of land and free building materials as well as fifteen years tax-free status, and later on he added freedom to practice one's profession and religion to the list.  However, the town only began to grow when it was granted city status in 1718 and then in that year became the royal residence and capital city of the country of Württemberg.  By the time of Eberhard Louis' death in 1733, the population had risen to around 6,000 people, which was more than half as big as the former capital city Stuttgart.  Nevertheless, the new capital city Ludwigsburg was still a major construction site with many unpaved streets and half-finished buildings.

For over two decades, Eberhard Louis (1676–1733) held court in Ludwigsburg with his mistress Wilhilmine von Grävenitz (1684–1744) while the Duchess Johanna Elisabeth (1680–1757) remained in Stuttgart.  The clever, ambitious mistress made the best of her time, influencing politics in Württemberg and advancing her status in society.  When it became clear that the seriously ill heir to the throne would not come to power, Eberhard Louis had a change of heart, split with his lover and reconciled with his wife in the hope that he would have another son.  This was cause for great joy for many people in Württemberg, as the Protestant population feared that power would fall into the hands of the Catholic side of the royal house.  To mark reconciliation, the Ludwigsburg citizenry published a leaflet with a copper etching that made reference to the general wish for a new heir to the throne.  The etching depicts the personification of Ludwigsburg who is receiving a pearl, a symbol of fertility, from the hand of God.  However, people's hopes for another child were not fulfilled as Eberhard Louis died in 1733 and his Catholic cousin, Charles Alexander, Duke of Württemberg, ascended to the throne.  When Charles Alexander immediately moved the capital of Württemberg back to Stuttgart, the population of the Ludwigsburg suddenly dropped by more than half within a year.

Jews and World War II
Jewish families began living in Ludwigsburg during the 19th century and in 1884, a synagogue was built on Solitudestraße. The synagogue was later destroyed by storm troopers during Kristallnacht, the pogrom of November 1938. In 1988, the perimeter of the structure was marked out in plaster on the site. A 1959 memorial and newer memorial plaques commemorate the Jewish Holocaust victims and extol human rights.

In 1940, a Nazi propaganda film, Jud Süß, was filmed in Ludwigsburg. The film was based on a historical figure, Joseph Süß Oppenheimer, who was executed in Stuttgart in 1738;  Oppenheimer lived in Ludwigsburg.

During World War II, the city suffered moderate damage compared to other German cities. There were 1500 deaths.
It was the home of the prisoner-of-war camp Stalag V-A from October 1939 till April 1945.  After the war, there was a large displaced persons camp which housed several thousand mainly Polish displaced persons until about 1948. After 1945 until the middle of 1946, there was also an allied internment camp for war criminals in Ludwigsburg and the U.S. Army maintained the Pattonville barracks on the edge of town, large enough to have its own American high school. The land was returned to Germany in 1994.

On 27 September 2008, the first 12 Stolpersteine were laid in Ludwigsburg. They are part of a project by artist Gunter Demnig to memorialize individuals who perished under Nazi persecution. Demnig was back in Ludwigsburg on 7 October 2009 to install more Stolpersteine.

Coat of arms

The coat of arms of Ludwigsburg depicts a black eagle on a golden banner flying on an oblique red lance, on a blue background. Duke Eberhard Louis, Duke of Württemberg awarded Ludwigsburg its coat of arms on 3 September 1718 as a Reichssturmfahne, which had been part of the Duchy of Württemberg's own coat of arms since 1495. There were some minor changes made to the design, as it had already been associated with the town of Markgröningen. A missive from the office of the mayor of Ludwigsburg in 1759–60 mentions its flag.

Public institutions
 Ludwigsburg has a court of first instance (magistrate’s/municipal court) (Amtsgericht in German), external benches of the Stuttgart Employment Tribunal, a tax- and revenue office, and an Employment Agency (German: Agentur für Arbeit).

 The Central Office of the State Justice Administrations for the Investigation of National Socialist Crimes(German: Zentrale Stelle der Landesjustizverwaltungen zur Aufklärung nationalsozialistischer Verbrechen or German: Zentrale Stelle or German: Z Commission), Germany's main agency responsible for investigating war crimes during Nazi rule, has its seat at Ludwigsburg.

 Further there is the district administration office (German: Landratsamt) of Ludwigsburg district.

 There is a teaching hospital with 969 beds of the University Hospital Heidelberg.

 The town is also the seat of a church district office of the Evangelical-Lutheran Church in Württemberg (German: Evangelische Landeskirche in Württemberg) and a deanery of the Roman Catholic Diocese of Rottenburg-Stuttgart. 
  
 Since its foundation in 1948 the Franco-German Institute (German: Deutsch-Französisches Institut (DFI)) has its seat at Ludwigsburg.

 Staatsarchiv Ludwigsburg

City government
The town council has 40 members. The last local election was on 25 May 2014. The voter participation was 44.62%. The results of the election were:

Business and industry
The North-South Powerline, includes a large transformer station Ludwigsburg-Hoheneck, built in 1926, which still exists today. It is a central junction in the power lines of Baden-Württemberg to this day.

On 5 October 1957, the first 380kV-powerline in Germany between the transformer station Ludwigsburg-Hoheneck and Rommerskirchen went into service.

Local businesses
 GdF Wüstenrot, building and loan association
 Beru AG, automotive supplier
 Getrag GmbH, automotive supplier (founded in Ludwigsburg, now in Untergruppenbach)
 Mann+Hummel, manufacturer of automotive filtration products
 Kreissparkasse Ludwigsburg, bank
 Volksbank Ludwigsburg, bank
Stihl
Bosch
Porsche
Mieschke Hofman und Partner
Mercedes-AMG
Gleason-Pfauter Maschinenfabrik GmbH

Education

In 1966, the Ludwigsburg University of Education (Pädagogische Hochschule) a teacher training college, and the Staatliche Sportschule Ludwigsburg (State Sports School) were opened.

Further universities based in Ludwigsburg are the Ludwigsburg University of Applied Sciences (Hochschule für öffentliche Verwaltung und Finanzen Ludwigsburg), a public institution for the training of higher-level Civil Servants), and the Ludwigsburg Evangelical University for Social Works, Church Social Works and Religious Teaching (Evangelische Hochschule Ludwigsburg (Hochschule für Soziale Arbeit, Religionspädagogik und Diakonie)). 
   
In 1991, a national film school, Film Academy Baden-Württemberg (Filmakademie Baden-Württemberg) was established in Ludwigsburg, which has won several national and international awards and is regarded as one of the best film schools in the world.

Since 2007, there is also the Academy of Performing Arts Baden-Wuerttemberg (Akademie für Darstellende Kunst Baden-Württemberg).
 
Ludwigsburg has eight secondary schools of various types and four vocational schools. There ere are also four special schools and seventeen primary schools. An adult high school and the city library are located at the cultural center behind the city hall.

Sports
Ludwigsburg has seven teams in the top level of professional sports. They are MHP Riesen Ludwigsburg (Basketball), both formations A and B of the dance team (1. Tanzclub Ludwigsburg), the Latin-formation (TSC Ludwigsburg), the Hockey-Club Ludwigsburg 1912 e. V., Svl08 (Water-polo) and the riflery team of Ludwigsburg. Additionally there are numerous amateur clubs for various sports.

Districts

Ludwigsburg consists of following districts:
 Mitte (Center)
 West 	
 Nord (North)
 Ost (East)
 Süd (South)
 Eglosheim 	
 Grünbühl-Sonnenberg 	
 Hoheneck, with a therapeutic and thermal bath, opened in 1907
 Neckarweihingen 	
 Oßweil 	
 Pflugfelden 	
 Poppenweiler

Neighbouring towns
The following towns are neighbouring towns of Ludwigsburg, starting north of the city and going clockwise: Freiberg am Neckar, Benningen am Neckar, Marbach am Neckar, Erdmannhausen, Affalterbach, Remseck am Neckar, Kornwestheim, Möglingen, Asperg und Tamm.

Population growth

Notable people
Karl Eugen, Duke of Württemberg, enrolled the young Friedrich Schiller in the Karlsschule Stuttgart (an elite military academy he had founded) in 1773, where Schiller eventually studied medicine. The Duke was very demanding of his students, and Schiller's childhood was a lonely and unhappy one, but he was greatly enriched by the excellent education he received. It was there that he wrote his first play, Die Räuber ("The Robbers"), about a group of naïve revolutionaries and their tragic failure.

Leopold Mozart visited Württemberg with his son, Wolfgang Amadeus Mozart in July 1763 and said, "Ludwigsburg is a very special town."

Charles Pfizer  geb. Karl Pfizer (1824–1906), chemist and founder of Pfizer Inc.
Wilhelm Emil Fein (1842–1898), inventor
Gerold von Gleich (1869–1938), army officer, military memoirist, physicist
Wilhelm Groener (1867–1939), officer and politician
Willi Hennig (1913–1976), biologist and founder of cladistics
Caesar von Hofacker (1896–1944), Luftwaffe officer and Nazi resistance member, hanged for treason
Eduard von Kallee (1818–1888), general, painter, and archaeologist
Richard Kallee (1854–1933), pastor of Stuttgart-Feuerbach
Justinus Kerner (1786–1862), writer and physician
Hartmut Michel (born 1948), co-recipient of 1988 Nobel Prize in Chemistry
Eduard Mörike (1804–1875), romantic poet and theologian
Nikolaos Nakas (born 1982), German former footballer
Karl Ludwig von Phull (1757–1826), general
Christian Friedrich Daniel Schubart (1739–1791), poet
Tony Schumacher (1848–1931), author of children's books
Hugo Sperrle (1885–1953), field marshal of the Luftwaffe during World War II
David Friedrich Strauß (1808–1874), theologian and writer
Albert Veiel (1806–1874), dermatologist
Friedrich Theodor Vischer (1807–1887), theologian, professor, and politician
Reinhard von Werneck (1757–1842), soldier and director of Munich's Englischer Garten
Antonio Čolak (born 1993), Croatian footballer

Notable residents

Ilse Koch (1906–1967), Nazi war criminal, lived there
Horst Köhler (born 1943), former Federal President of Germany, grew up there
Hans Scholl (1918–1943), student and resistance fighter, executed by the Nazis
Sophie Scholl (1921–1943), student and resistance fighter, executed by the Nazis
Friedrich Silcher (1789–1860), composer, wrote music there
Carl Maria von Weber (1786–1826), composer, wrote music there
Eva Heller (1948–2008), author and social scientist, grew up there

Twin towns – sister cities

Ludwigsburg is twinned with:
 Montbéliard, France (1950)
 Caerphilly, Wales, United Kingdom (1960)
 Yevpatoria, Ukraine (1990)
 St. Charles, United States (1995)
 Nový Jičín, Czech Republic (1991)

References

Further reading
 Andrea Hahn: Ludwigsburg, Stationen einer Stadt, Andreas Hackenberg Verlag, Ludwigsburg 2004, 
 Gernot von Hahn, Friedhelm Horn: Ludwigsburg, Stadt der Schlösser und Gärten, Medien-Verlag Schubert, Stuttgart 1998, 
 Bruno Hahnemann: Ludwigsburg. Stadt – Schlösser – Blühendes Barock, Verlag Ungeheuer + Ulmer, Ludwigsburg 1979
 on the sidelines, Frederick Forsyth: The Odessa File
 Annette Weinke, Eine Gesellschaft ermittelt gegen sich selbst. Die Geschichte der Zentralen Stelle Ludwigsburg 1958–2008 (Darmstadt: Wissenschaftliche Buchgesellschaft, 2008).
 Hans H. Pöschko (Hg.), Die Ermittler von Ludwigsburg. Deutschland und die Aufklärung nationalsozialistischer Verbrechen (Berlin: Metropol 2008).
 Tobias Herrmann / Gisela Müller, Mitteilungen aus dem Bundesarchiv. Themenheft 2008: Die Außenstelle Ludwigsburg (Koblenz: Bundesarchiv 2008).

External links

 Official website of the City of Ludwigsburg
 Tourism Information about Ludwigsburg

Other educational institutions
Carl-Schaefer-Schule 
Elly-Heuss-Knapp Realschule 
Eugen-Bolz Hauptschule 
Friedrich-Schiller-Gymnasium 
Goethe-Gymnasium 
Gottlieb-Daimler Realschule 
Moerike-Gymnasium 
Oststadt Hauptschule 
Otto-Hahn-Gymnasium 
Uhlandschule Hauptschule 
Oscar-Walcker-Schule 

 
Populated places established in 1704
Towns in Baden-Württemberg
Ludwigsburg (district)
1704 establishments in the Holy Roman Empire
Holocaust locations in Germany
Populated places on the Neckar basin
Populated riverside places in Germany
Württemberg